The 2017 President's Cup (Maldives) Final was the 67th Final of the Maldives President's Cup.

Route to the final

New Radiant

TC Sports

Match

Details

Match rules
90 minutes.
30 minutes of extra-time if necessary.
Penalty shoot-out if scores still level.
Maximum of three substitutions.

See also
2016 President's Cup (Maldives)

References

President's Cup (Maldives) finals
Pres